General elections were held in Mexico on Sunday, 2 July 2000. Voters went to the polls to elect a new president to serve a single six-year term, replacing President Ernesto Zedillo Ponce de León, who was ineligible for re-election under the 1917 Constitution. The election system ran under plurality voting; 500 members of the Chamber of Deputies (300 by the first-past-the-post system and 200 by proportional representation) for three-year terms and 128 members of the Senate (three per state by first-past-the-post – two first-past-the-post seats are allocated to the party with the largest share of the vote; the remaining seat is given to the first runner-up – and 32 by proportional representation from national party lists) for six-year terms.

The presidential election was won by Vicente Fox of the Alliance for Change, who received 43.4% of the vote, the first time the opposition had won an election since the Mexican Revolution. In the congressional elections the Alliance for Change emerged as the largest faction in the Chamber of Deputies with 224 of the 500 seats, whilst the Institutional Revolutionary Party remained the largest faction in the Senate with 60 of the 128 seats in the Senate. Voter turnout was between 63 and 64% in the elections.

This historically significant election made Fox the first president elected from an opposition party since Francisco I. Madero in 1911, as well as the first in 71 years to defeat, with 42 percent of the vote, the then-dominant Institutional Revolutionary Party.

Opinion polls
PRI candidate Francisco Labastida led in nearly all the polls throughout the first months of the campaign, although in the final two months his lead grew smaller; on the other hand, PAN candidate Vicente Fox was at second place in most of the polls, but in May and June his percentage of supporters increased and he led in many of the final polls.

Given that the overwhelming majority of the polls failed to predict Fox's victory and instead had indicated that Labastida would win by comfortable margins, it has been asserted that many of those polled lied about their preferences, fearing that if they stated support for an opposition party, they would be stripped by the PRI of the government assistance programs they were receiving. Indeed, the Reforma newspaper, which had predicted a Labastida victory in all of the polls they published during the campaign, attributed their mistake to the so-called fear factor.

Conduct

Some isolated incidents of irregularities and problems were reported. For example, one irregularity in the southern state of Campeche involved the European Union electoral observer Rocco Buttiglione and could have created problems for President Ernesto Zedillo had the PRI candidate won. Overall, however, electoral observers identified little evidence that those incidents were centrally coordinated (as opposed to led by local PRI officials), and critics concluded that those irregularities which did occur did not materially alter the outcome of the presidential vote, which had been more definitive than expected.

Civic organizations fielded more than 80,000 trained electoral observers, foreign observers were invited to witness the process, and numerous "quick count" operations and exit polls (not all of them independent) validated the official vote tabulation. The largest exit poll was organized by the U.S. firm Penn, Schoen & Berland, financed by a hitherto obscure outfit in Dallas called Democracy Watch. It emerged later that Democracy Watch had effectively been created by Vicente Fox campaign insiders to help prevent the success of any expected election fraud.

Numerous electoral reforms implemented since 1989 aided in the opening of the Mexican political system, and since then opposition parties have made historic gains in elections at all levels. The chief electoral concerns shifted from outright fraud to campaign fairness issues and, between 1995 and 1996, the political parties negotiated constitutional amendments to address these issues. The legislation implemented included major points of consensus that had been worked out with the opposition parties. Under the new laws, public financing predominated over private contributions to political parties, procedures for auditing parties were tightened, and the authority and independence of the electoral institutions were strengthened. The court system was also given greatly expanded authority to hear civil rights cases on electoral matters brought by individuals or groups. In short, the extensive reform efforts of the 1990s "leveled the playing field" for the parties.

Results

President

By state

Voter demographics

Senate

Chamber of Deputies

Campaign items (image gallery)

References

Mexico
General
Presidential elections in Mexico
Legislative elections in Mexico
July 2000 events in Mexico